Lest We Forget is a 1918 American silent World War I espionage drama film directed by Leonce Perret and produced by and starring Rita Jolivet. The film was released by the Metro Pictures company. While the picture is essentially a spy film, it may also be considered a propaganda film popular during World War I.

Plot
The film was a live action film about the 1915 Lusitania sinking (as opposed to Windsor McKay's animated film The Sinking of the Lusitania (1918)). Actress Rita Jolivet was a survivor of the sinking and much of what is known about the last moments of her producer/employer Charles Frohman is related from her. This film made famous his last words, "..Why fear death for it is the most beautiful adventure in life."

Cast
Rita Jolivet as Rita Heriot
Hamilton Revelle as Harry Winslow
L. Rogers Lytton as Baron von Bergen
Kate Blancke as Madame Heriot
Clifford Saum as Fritz Muller
Emil Roe as Mayor Le Roux
Henry Smith as General Joffre
Gaby Perrier as Young Mother
Texas Cooper
H. P. St. Leger
Ernest Maupain

Reception
Like many American films of the time, Lest We Forget was subject to cuts by city and state film censorship boards. For example, the Chicago Board of Censors required cuts of, in Reel 1, the intertitle "Why marry her?", Reel 3, that part of the scene in the telegraph office where officer throws young woman over table and is shown bending over her, Reel 4, the intertitle "Go, all of you — I will avenge this", and, Reel 7, the cutting of telephone wires.

Preservation status
The film survives in a fragment at George Eastman House Motion Picture Collection with more complete copies at the Library of Congress and Cinémathèque Française.

References

External links

1918 films
American silent feature films
Films directed by Léonce Perret
American black-and-white films
American war drama films
1910s war drama films
American World War I propaganda films
Metro Pictures films
1918 drama films
1910s American films
Silent American drama films
Silent war drama films
1910s English-language films